Agyneta propinqua is a species of sheet weaver found in Brazil and Peru. It was described by Millidge in 1991.

References

propinqua
Spiders described in 1991
Spiders of South America